G. Mahathevan (born 31 May 1988) is a Malaysian former footballer.

In February 2011, Mahathevan was called up to the Malaysia national team for the first time by coach K. Rajagopal for the friendly match against Hong Kong national team where he made his debut as a substitute player.

References

External links
 
 

Living people
1988 births
Malaysian people of Tamil descent
Malaysian sportspeople of Indian descent
Malaysian footballers
Malaysia international footballers
Negeri Sembilan FA players
Terengganu F.C. II players
Penang F.C. players
Sarawak FA players
Sportspeople from Kuala Lumpur
Malaysia Super League players
Association football defenders